

References

Sunshine duration
Day